Live in Las Vegas is a four-disc box set by American singer and musician Elvis Presley, released in July 2001 on RCA Records, catalogue 07863 69354-2. It comprises live recordings from shows given by Presley in Las Vegas through every decade of his career.

Content
Disc one comprises a complete show from August 24, 1969, and disc two a complete show from August 11, 1970. Discs three and four present recordings from shows over a time span from 1956 through 1975, not in chronological order.

In his review of the album, music critic Lindsay Planer stated:
A vibrant and overwhelmingly energetic Presley is the focus of the first two discs - containing complete performances from August 24, 1969, and August 11, 1970, respectively. As one may well anticipate, the sets feature a healthy sampling of Presley's voluminous back catalogue. "Hound Dog", "Heartbreak Hotel", "Love Me Tender", and "I Got a Woman" are given a workout during each performance. As were the more current hits such as "Suspicious Minds", "In the Ghetto", and "Can't Help Falling in Love". Presley's knack for inimitable remakes is also displayed as he gains inspiration from concurrent chart-toppers such as "Hey Jude", "Bridge over Troubled Water", and "Polk Salad Annie". Unlike the first two discs, the final pair do not contain complete performances and likewise are not presented chronologically. For the sake of contrast, the four song mini-set documenting the final performance of Presley's first Vegas stand on May 6, 1956, begins disc four. What remains consistent - in both the brief 1956 set as well as on the remainder of the mid-'70s recordings - is Presley's impeccable taste in cover material.

Track listing

Chart performance

References

External links

2001 live albums
2001 compilation albums
Compilation albums published posthumously
Elvis Presley compilation albums
Elvis Presley live albums
Live albums published posthumously
Albums recorded at Westgate Las Vegas